Prep Bowl may refer to:

 Chicago Prep Bowl, an annual football game between the Chicago Catholic League and the Chicago Public League
 Minnesota Prep Bowl, the high school football championship in Minnesota